Anisonema is a genus of colorless flagellates that occur in marine, brackish, and freshwater habitats. The cell is typically ovoid, somewhat flattened, and rigid. The name Anisonema derives from Greek for "unequal thread", in reference to the two flagella that are of unequal lengths. The shorter flagellum extends forwards and propels movement with a sweeping motion, while the longer flagellum, up to three times the length of the cell, trails behind, with jerking contractions.

The genus was first named by French biologist Félix Dujardin his 1841 Histoire naturelle des zoophytes. Infusoires, comprenant la physiologie et la classification de ces animaux, et la manière de les étudier à l'aide du microscope.

, there are around 20 accepted species in the genus.

References

Euglenozoa
Euglenozoa genera